Bash-Baybakovo (Baş-Baybaq) is a rural locality (a village) in Uryadinsky Selsoviet, Mishkinsky District, Bashkortostan, Russia. The population was 58 as of 2010. There are 2 streets.

Geography 
Bash-Baybakovo is located 16 km southeast of Mishkino (the district's administrative centre) by road. Russkoye Baybakovo is the nearest rural locality.

References 

Rural localities in Mishkinsky District